The N-622 (known unofficially as the ) is a road in Álava, Basque Country, Spain. Together with the AP-68 motorway, it constitutes the most important road link between Bilbao and Vitoria-Gasteiz. The whole road is a dual carriageway, with parts of it classified as autovía.

History
The road opened gradually in 1978 after more than two years of works. The Murgia bypass was opened in mid-June, followed a few weeks later by the stretch from Vitoria-Gasteiz to Arangiz. The Letona-Zarate stretch was opened partially (only one of the carriageways) on 22 August, while the Arangiz-Zarate stretch followed in early September. On 14 October the last remaining section of the road was inaugurated, with the opening of the second Aiurdin tunnel.

On 3 June 2009, the interchange with the new AP-1 motorway at Etxabarri Ibiña opened. Traffic from the AP-1 towards the A-1 motorway uses the N-622 from Etxabarri Ibiña to the cloverleaf interchange with the A-1 near Vitoria-Gasteiz. As a result, that stretch suffers from recurrent traffic jams, particularly in the summer. In 2022, a study to improve the traffic flow in the area was announced.

References

External links
 

1978 establishments in the Basque Country (autonomous community)
Autopistas and autovías in Spain
National roads in Spain
Roads in the Basque Country (autonomous community)